The Socialist Labour Party (SLP) was a minor political party in the Republic of Ireland formed under the leadership of Matt Merrigan (Dublin Secretary of the ATGWU) and Noël Browne, TD in 1977. Another key figure was the radical journalist Brian Trench, former head of the Communications Department at Dublin City University along with the former Clann na Poblachta TD Jack McQuillan. The founders came from the Liaison Committee of the Labour Left, which in 1975/76 had tried to build the "Left Alternative", a coalition of progressive organisations and individuals, aimed at addressing what they saw as the cultural and economic impoverishment of Irish society by the establishment parties of Fianna Fáil and Fine Gael.

The SLP regarded itself as highly progressive. It allowed for the right of factions to organise within the Party.  The most notable were the Socialist Workers Tendency, organised around members of the Socialist Workers' Movement which left in 1980, the Workers Alliance for Action organised around members of the Irish Workers' Group which left in 1979 and the Republican Socialist Tendency, organised around members of People's Democracy, which also left in 1979.

In the 1981 general election the party fielded 7 candidates, with Noël Browne elected for Dublin North-Central. Following a continuing decline in membership, the SLP was dissolved in 1982.

Candidates in the 1981 Irish general election

References

1977 establishments in Ireland
1982 disestablishments in Ireland
Defunct political parties in the Republic of Ireland
Labour parties in Ireland
Political parties disestablished in 1982
Political parties established in 1977
Socialist parties in Ireland